In Greek mythology, the name Echion  (Ancient Greek: Ἐχῑ́ων (gen.: Ἐχίονος), derivative of ἔχις echis "viper") referred to five different beings:

Echion, one of the Gigantes, known for great strength (though not necessarily great size) and having an ability to change the course or direction of winds.
Echion, one of the surviving Spartoi, the "sown men" that sprang up from the dragon's teeth sown by Cadmus, and principally known for skill in battle and bravery; "it was Echion who, for his great valor, was preferred by Cadmus to be his son-in-law": Echion was father of Pentheus and Epeiros by Agave. He was credited to be the founder of the Malian city of Echinos.
Echion, one of the Argonauts, son of Hermes and Antianeira or Laothoe (daughter of Menetus), brother of Erytus; participated in the Calydonian boar hunt, according to Hyginus and Ovid.
Echion, son of Portheus and one of the Greeks who fought at the Trojan War. He was also one of the men hidden in the Trojan horse and was killed. The doomed Greek is a "tough but battle weary warrior, plagued by phantasms of his death".
Echion, one of the suitors who came with 53 others from Dulichium to compete for Penelope. He, with the other suitors, was shot dead by Odysseus with the help of Eumaeus, Philoetius, and Telemachus.

Notes

References 
 Apollodorus, The Library with an English Translation by Sir James George Frazer, F.B.A., F.R.S. in 2 Volumes, Cambridge, MA, Harvard University Press; London, William Heinemann Ltd. 1921. ISBN 0-674-99135-4. Online version at the Perseus Digital Library. Greek text available from the same website.
 Apollonius Rhodius, Argonautica translated by Robert Cooper Seaton (1853-1915), R. C. Loeb Classical Library Volume 001. London, William Heinemann Ltd, 1912. Online version at the Topos Text Project.
Apollonius Rhodius, Argonautica. George W. Mooney. London. Longmans, Green. 1912. Greek text available at the Perseus Digital Library.
Claudius Claudianus, Battle of the Giants from Carmina Minora translated by Platnauer, Maurice. Loeb Classical Library Volumes 135 & 136. Cambridge, MA. Harvard University Press. 1922.  Online version at Bill Thayer's Web Site
 Gaius Julius Hyginus, Fabulae from The Myths of Hyginus translated and edited by Mary Grant. University of Kansas Publications in Humanistic Studies. Online version at the Topos Text Project.
 Graves, Robert, The Greek Myths, Harmondsworth, London, England, Penguin Books, 1960. 
 Pausanias, Description of Greece with an English Translation by W.H.S. Jones, Litt.D., and H.A. Ormerod, M.A., in 4 Volumes. Cambridge, MA, Harvard University Press; London, William Heinemann Ltd. 1918. . Online version at the Perseus Digital Library
 Pausanias, Graeciae Descriptio. 3 vols. Leipzig, Teubner. 1903.  Greek text available at the Perseus Digital Library.
 Publius Ovidius Naso, Metamorphoses translated by Brookes More (1859-1942). Boston, Cornhill Publishing Co. 1922. Online version at the Perseus Digital Library.
 Publius Ovidius Naso, Metamorphoses. Hugo Magnus. Gotha (Germany). Friedr. Andr. Perthes. 1892. Latin text available at the Perseus Digital Library.
 Stephanus of Byzantium, Stephani Byzantii Ethnicorum quae supersunt, edited by August Meineike (1790-1870), published 1849. A few entries from this important ancient handbook of place names have been translated by Brady Kiesling. Online version at the Topos Text Project.

Argonauts
Gigantes
Achaeans (Homer)
Suitors of Penelope
Characters in the Argonautica

ca:Equíon (fill d'Hermes)
it:Echione (Ermes)
pl:Echion (syn Hermesa)
fi:Ekhion (argonautti)